Sherman Andrus (born June 23, 1942) is an American gospel singer, who is probably best known as the man who broke the "color barrier" by becoming the first African-American lead singer of a mainstream Christian music group (The Imperials). He has been a very prolific artist who has been involved in one way or another with forty gospel albums to date.

Biography
Andrus began in gospel music by singing with his mother's gospel group  in his boyhood hometown of Mermentau, Louisiana. His next step came with a band called COGICs named after the denomination of the church that the band's founder, Andrae Crouch, attended (Church of God in Christ). Andrus continued his association with Crouch as he formed the popular contemporary Christian music act Andrae Crouch and the Disciples in 1964. That group would not only gain notoriety within the gospel music field for merging funkier rhythms with the gospel message but a measure of fame outside of gospel fandom with an appearance on late night television's The Tonight Show Starring Johnny Carson. Andrus would tour with the group through 1970.

Andrus joined The Imperials in February 1972, replacing the departing Greg Gordon. He recorded as co-lead singer along with Terry Blackwood for their albums Imperials (1972),Imperials LIVE (1973),Follow the Man with the Music (1974),Grammy winning No Shortage (1975), and Just Because (1976) before joining Blackwood in a new duo Andrus, Blackwood and Company. That pairing would release six albums from 1977 to 1984.

Andrus began a solo career in 1986 which continues today. In 1997 he joined the tour Elvis: The Concert, sponsored by Elvis Presley Enterprises, to commemorate the 20th anniversary of Elvis's death. Andrus and other original musicians and backing singers appeared alongside a live recording of Presley to attempt to mimic a 1970s era live Presley appearance.

On April 2, 1998, Sherman Andrus was inducted into the Gospel Music Hall of Fame, both as a member of The Imperials as well as a founding member of Andrae Crouch And The Disciples. Sherman studied music at Southern University, now resides in Oklahoma City, Oklahoma with his wife Winnie. Their son, Sherman Jr., died on August 28, 2013, and was survived by his wife, Mary; their son, Patrick Sherman; and daughter, Samantha.

In April 2002 Sherman joined with longtime friend, Lonny Bingle, to form Andrus and Bingle. Together they have written all of the songs on both of their releases with the most current, "A Servant's Heart," in 2013. In September 2016 they will be doing a "Live" album benefitting the Youth and Police Initiative in Spokane, Washington. They are currently touring and writing music for their fourth album entitled "Seize the Moment" scheduled for release in 2017.

Partial discography 
Sources:
 1973: I've Got Confidence (Impact)
 1976: Soon Coming (Shalom)
 1978: How The Years Pass By (Shalom)
 1982: Revisited (Christian World)
 1988: Caution To the Wind (Amethyst)
 1993: Seize The Moment (Exodus Records)
 1994: Live: Hit Me Band (Exodus Records)
 2003: Merry Christmas From Sherman Andrus
 2002: Think Upon These Things – Andrus and Bingle
 2013: A Servant's Heart – Andrus and Bingle
 2017: LIVE – Andrus and Bingle

Video
1987: Toymaker's Dream (soundtrack)
1999: He Touched Me – The Gospel Music of Elvis Presley
2002: New Orleans Homecoming; solo on "Precious Lord, Take My Hand"
2002: Let Freedom Ring "A Few Good Men"
2006: Elvis Lives: The 25th Anniversary Concert (recorded 2002)

References 

People from Mermentau, Louisiana
Musicians from Honolulu
African-American Christians
American Pentecostals
African-American musicians
Living people
American performers of Christian music
1942 births
Christians from Louisiana
21st-century African-American people
20th-century African-American people